Alberto Baldé Almánzar (born 21 March 2002) is a professional footballer who plays as a forward for the Portadown in the NIFL Premiership. Born in Spain and raised in Northern Ireland, he plays for the Dominican Republic national team.

Early life
Baldé was born in Madrid, Spain to a Bissau-Guinean father and a Dominican mother. He moved to Northern Ireland with his mother at a young age.

Club career
Baldé joined the youth academy of the Northern Ireland club Portadown at the age of 12 when he knew no English, and gained national attention as the focus of a Google advertisement highlighting how his coaches used Google Translate to communicate with him. At 15, he became their youngest ever goalscorer in a 2–1 NIFL Championship win over Knockbreda. He joined Middlesbrough's reserves in 2018. He briefly joined non-league club Pickering Town on loan in November 2021. He was released by Middlesbrough when his contract ended in June 2022, and rejoined Portadown.

International career
Baldé is a youth international for the Northern Ireland U15s and Northern Ireland U16s in 2017. He was called up to the Dominican Republic national team for matches in June 2022. He debuted with the Dominican Republic in a 3–2 CONCACAF Nations League loss to French Guiana on 5 June 2022, coming on as a substitute in the 67th minute.

References

External links
 
 EverythingForFootball Profile

2002 births
Living people
Footballers from Madrid
Dominican Republic footballers
Dominican Republic international footballers
Spanish emigrants to the United Kingdom
Naturalised citizens of the United Kingdom
Association footballers from Northern Ireland
Northern Ireland youth international footballers
Spanish footballers
Dominican Republic people of Bissau-Guinean descent
Sportspeople of Bissau-Guinean descent
Northern Ireland people of Dominican Republic descent
Sportspeople of Dominican Republic descent
Northern Ireland people of Bissau-Guinean descent
Black British sportsmen
Spanish people of Dominican Republic descent
Spanish people of Bissau-Guinean descent
Spanish sportspeople of African descent
Citizens of the Dominican Republic through descent
Association football midfielders
Middlesbrough F.C. players
Pickering Town F.C. players
Portadown F.C. players
NIFL Premiership players